Machi (also romanized as Machī) is a village in Kangan Rural District, in the Central District of Jask County, Hormozgan Province, Iran. At the 2006 census, its population was 149, in 27 families.

References 

Populated places in Jask County